I Am Twenty (translit. Mne dvadtsat let) is a 1965 drama film directed by Marlen Khutsiev. It is Khutsiev's most famous film and considered a landmark of 1960s Soviet cinema.

The film was originally entitled Zastava Iliycha (known in English alternately as Ilyich's Gate or Lenin's Guard), but it was heavily censored upon completion, trimmed to half its original length, retitled and withheld from release until 1965. A restored 3-hour version was released in 1989, and is sometimes referred to by the original title.

Synopsis
The film follows the recently demobilized Sergei, a young man who returns to his Moscow neighborhood after two years of military service. We see the aspirations and realities of his tightly knit group of friends, as well as the everyday lives of other Soviet citizens.

Cast
 Valentin Popov as Sergey Zhuravlyov (as V. Popov)
 Nikolay Gubenko as Nikolay 'Kolya' Fokin (as N. Gubenko)
 Stanislav Lyubshin as Slava Kostikov (as S. Lyubshin)
 Marianna Vertinskaya as Anya (as M. Vertinskaya)
 Zinaida Zinoveva as Olga Mikhaylovna Zhuravlyova (as Z. Zinovyeva)
 Svetlana Starikova as Vera Zhuravlyova (as S. Starikova)
 Lev Prygunov as Aleksandr Zhuravlyov (as L. Prygunov)
 Tatiana Bogdanova as Lyusya Kostikova (as T. Bogdanova)
 Lyudmila Selyanskaya as Katya Yermakova, conductress (as L. Selyanskaya)
 Aleksandr Blinov as Kuzmich (as Sasha Blinov)

Style

I Am Twenty is notable for its often dramatic camera movements, handheld camerawork and heavy use of location shooting, often incorporating non-actors (including a group of foreign exchange students from Ghana and famous poets, among them Yevgeny Yevtushenko) and centering scenes around non-staged events (a May Day parade, a building demolition, a poetry reading). Filmmakers Andrei Tarkovsky and Andrei Konchalovsky both play small roles in the film, as do Rodion Nakhapetov and Lev Prygunov. The dialogue often overlaps and there are stylized flourishes that echo the early French New Wave, especially François Truffaut's black and white films. The screenplay, co-written by Gennady Shpalikov, originally called for a film running only 90 minutes, but the full version of the film runs for three hours.

Production and censorship
I Am Twenty began production in 1959, during the de-Stalinization period of the Khrushchev thaw, when Soviet society experienced several years of unprecedented freedom of speech.

By the time the film was finished, the thaw was waning and the film's openly critical view of Stalinism was deemed unacceptable, as was its portrayal of the lives of everyday Soviet youth worrying about money and jobs and listening to Western music. At a speech in March 1963, Khrushchev personally attacked the film and denounced Khutsiev and his collaborators for "[thinking] that young people ought to decide for themselves how to live, without asking their elders for counsel and help."

References

External links

A critical essay on the film
Dramatic adaptation produced by Radio Moscow at The WNYC Archives

1960s Russian-language films
1965 films
Venice Grand Jury Prize winners
Films directed by Marlen Khutsiev
Soviet teen films